Jericho is a city, populated since ancient times, in the West Bank, Palestine.

Jericho may also refer to:

Places

Australia
 Jericho, Queensland, a town and locality
 Shire of Jericho, Queensland, a former local government area (1916–2008)
 Jericho, South Australia, a suburb of Kadina
 Jericho, Tasmania, one of the oldest townships in Australia

Canada
 Jericho, New Brunswick, a community in Carleton County
 Jericho Beach, Vancouver, British Columbia
 Jericho, a community in the municipality of Lambton Shores, Ontario

England
 Jericho, Bury, a district
 Jericho, Cumbria, a small hamlet
 Jericho, Oxford, a suburb of Oxford

South Africa
 Jericho, North West, South Africa, a village
 Jericho Dam, Mpama River, South Africa

United States
 Jericho, Arkansas, a town
 Jericho Trail, a hiking trail in Connecticut
 Jericho, Indiana, an unincorporated community
 Jericho, Kentucky, an unincorporated community
 Jericho Mountain, New Hampshire
 Jericho, Cumberland County, New Jersey, an unincorporated community
 Jericho, Gloucester County, New Jersey, an unincorporated community
 Jericho, New York, a hamlet and census-designated place
 Jericho Historic District, East Hampton, New York
 New York State Route 25 or Jericho Turnpike, a thoroughfare on Long Island, New York
 Jericho, North Carolina, an unincorporated community
 Jericho, Cameron County, Pennsylvania
 Jericho, Wayne County, Pennsylvania
 Jericho, Vermont, a town
 Jericho (village), Vermont
 Jericho, West Virginia, an unincorporated community
 Jericho, Calumet County, Wisconsin, an unincorporated community
 Jericho, Waukesha County, Wisconsin, an unincorporated community
 Jericho Creek (disambiguation), various creeks throughout the country

Elsewhere
 Jericho, Nairobi, an estate in Kenya
 Jericho Governorate, West Bank, Palestine
 Jericho, the medieval name of Oricum, in what is now Albania
 Jericho Road, part of Route 417 in Israel

Films
 Jericho (1937 film), also known as Dark Sands, a British film starring Paul Robeson
 Jericho (1946 film), a French film
 Jericho (1991 film), a Venezuelan film
 Jericho (2000 film), a Western mystery film

Television
 Jericho (1966 TV series)
 Jericho (UK TV series), a 2005 detective television series
 Jericho (2006 TV series), a post-apocalyptic drama television series
 Jericho (2016 TV series), a drama set in 1870s Yorkshire Dales
 "Jericho" (Titans episode)
 Jericho, a fictional terrorist organization in FlashForward
 Jericho, a sock puppet used by Cyril O'Reilly in Oz
 Jericho Turner, a main character in the 2019-2023 TV series Servant

Music

Artists
 Jericho (band), a band from Israel
 Jericho (rapper) (born 1980), hip-hop recording artist from Namibia
 Jericho, a musical project of Mark Salling

Albums
 Jericho (The Band album), 1993
 Jericho (Prism album), 1993
Jericho (Jericho album), 1972

Songs
 "Jericho", a 1974 song by Joni Mitchell from Miles of Aisles
 "Jericho", a 1986 song by Simply Red from Picture Book
 "Fire/Jericho" a 1992 song by the Prodigy from Prodigy
 "Jericho", a 1995 song by Arena from Songs from the Lion's Cage
 "Jericho", a 2004 song by Hilary Duff from Hilary Duff
 "Jericho", a 2015 song by Celldweller from End of an Empire
 "Jericho" (Andrew Ripp song), 2020

Print
 Jericho (Amalgam Comics), a character in the Exciting X-Patrol
 Jericho (DC Comics), a member of the Teen Titans
 Koenma or Jericho, a character from YuYu Hakusho
 Jericho, a novel by Dirk Bogarde
 Jericho Books, an imprint of Hachette Book Group

Video games
 Clive Barker's Jericho, horror-themed video game released in 2007
 Jericho Cross, protagonist of Darkwatch
 Jericho, a companion character in Fallout 3
 The abandoned freighter now a refugee center for deviant androids Jericho, in Detroit Become Human

Military
 Battle of Jericho, an incident in the biblical Book of Joshua
 Jericho (missile), a ballistic missile (rocket) produced by Israel
 Jericho 941, a handgun also known as the IMI Jericho and IWI Jericho, produced by Israel Weapons 
 Operation Jericho, a World War II mission

Schools
 Jericho High School, New York, United States
 Jericho School, a historic one-room school building in Caroline County, Virginia

People
 Jericho (given name)
 Luke Jericho (born 1984), Australian rules footballer
 Chris Jericho, ring name of Christopher Irvine (born 1970), professional wrestler and lead singer of the band Fozzy
 Jericho (streamer), an online username of American Twitch streamer and YouTube content creator William Boner (born 1993)

Other uses
 Jericho Diamond Mine, Nunavut, Canada
 Jericho Forum, an information and communications technology security forum
 Jericho, a lion, companion to Cecil

See also
 Géricault, French painter
 Jericó (disambiguation)
 Jerichow, Germany, a city
 Jerricho, a name
 Ariha (disambiguation)